Coordinates: 

The Bon Echo hut is an alpine hut located in Bon Echo Provincial Park on Mazinaw Lake in Ontario.  The hut is maintained by the Toronto Section of the Alpine Club of Canada.  

This is a day-use hut with no sleeping facilities. It is equipped with propane-powered lamps and stovetops and a wood-burning fireplace for heating and drying clothes. There are numerous tent sites on the property for use by Alpine Club members and guests during summer weekends.

Unlike most other alpine huts managed by the Alpine Club, the ACC owns the land on which the hut is built.

The hut can be reached by boat from the park's dock on Mazinaw Lake. It is a 3-4 hour drive from Toronto.

External links
 Bon Echo hut at the Alpine Club of Canada
 BonEcho hut at climbers.org

Mountain huts in Canada